WIMM-LP (107.9 FM) is a Catholic Religious radio station licensed to Owensboro, Kentucky, United States. The station is currently owned by Trinity Educational Radio Association.

References

External links
WIMM-LP Online
 

Low-power FM radio stations in Kentucky
IMM-LP